In descriptive statistics, a decile is any of the nine values that divide the sorted data into ten equal parts, so that each part represents 1/10 of the sample or population. A decile is one possible form of a quantile; others include the quartile and percentile. A decile rank arranges the data in order from lowest to highest and is done on a scale of one to ten where each successive number corresponds to an increase of 10 percentage points.

Special Usage: The decile mean

It is calculated as follows:

 

Apart from serving as an alternative for the mean and the truncated mean, it also forms the basis for robust measures of skewness and kurtosis, and even a normality test.

See also
 Summary statistics
 Socio-economic decile (for New Zealand schools)

References

Summary statistics

de:Quantil#Dezil
ru:Квантиль#Дециль